Margarida "Maggy" Moreno Sánchez (born 3 April 1968) is an Andorran track and field athlete who competed at the 1992 Summer Olympics.

Moreno's first major competition was the 1991 IAAF World Indoor Championships where she competed in the high jump after jumping  she finished qualification in 26th place so didn't qualify for the final, later in the year she also competed in the high jump at the 1991 World Championships in Athletics in Tokyo, she only managed to jump  so again failed to reach the final.

The following year Moreno was picked for the 1992 Summer Olympics, she was also chosen to be her countries flag bearer at the opening ceremony, in the high jump she jumped  and finished 41st so didn't qualify for the final.

Notes

References

External links
 
 
 

Living people
1968 births
Olympic athletes of Andorra
Athletes (track and field) at the 1992 Summer Olympics
World Athletics Championships athletes for Andorra